1946 Walraven is a stony asteroid from the inner regions of the asteroid belt, approximately 10 kilometers in diameter. It was discovered on 8 August 1931, by Dutch astronomer Hendrik van Gent at Leiden Southern Station, annex to the Johannesburg Observatory in South Africa, and named after astronomer Theodore Walraven.

Classification and orbit 

Walraven is a stony S-type asteroid that orbits the Sun in the inner main-belt at a distance of 1.8–2.8 AU once every 3 years and 6 months (1,270 days). Its orbit has an eccentricity of 0.23 and an inclination of 8° with respect to the ecliptic. The body's observation arc begins one day prior to its official discovery observation.

Naming 

This minor planet was named in honor of astronomer and pioneer in optical instrumentation and precision photometry, Theodore Fjeda Walraven (1916–2008), who was a professor at the Leiden University and for many years resident astronomer at the former Leiden Southern Station near Hartbeespoortdam, South Africa.

Walraven constructed special photometers for the telescopes at the station, including the 5-color photometer for which he developed the Walraven photometric system. The approved naming citation was published by the Minor Planet Center on 2 April 1988.

Physical characteristics

Rotation period 

Four rotational lightcurves of Walraven were obtained from photometric observation, giving a rotation period between 10.210 and 10.223 hours with a brightness variation of 0.60 to 0.90 magnitude.

Diameter and albedo 

According to the survey carried out by NASA's Wide-field Infrared Survey Explorer with its subsequent NEOWISE mission, Walraven measures 9.2 kilometers in diameter and its surface has an albedo of 0.362, while the Collaborative Asteroid Lightcurve Link assumes a standard albedo for stony asteroids of 0.20, and calculates a diameter of 11.8 kilometers with an absolute magnitude of 12.0.

References

External links 
 Asteroid Lightcurve Database (LCDB), query form (info )
 Dictionary of Minor Planet Names, Google books
 Asteroids and comets rotation curves, CdR – Observatoire de Genève, Raoul Behrend
 Discovery Circumstances: Numbered Minor Planets (1)-(5000) – Minor Planet Center
 
 

 

001946
Discoveries by Hendrik van Gent
Named minor planets
19310808